Cherry Bomb is a 2011 American action film starring Julin Jean and adult film star Nick Manning, in his first leading role in a mainstream film.

Plot
Set in 1984 in a small Texas town, Cherry Bomb follows the story of Cherry, an exotic dancer who is sexually assaulted by a group of people in the club where she works. Upon waking in the hospital, Cherry soon comes to find that all of the people have escaped justice, seemingly due to the help of corrupt local law enforcement. Against all odds, Cherry teams up with her estranged brother and vows revenge against the people who left her emotionally and physically broken. But things don't always go as planned, and Cherry finds herself up against the police, a vicious hired gun, and a barrage of unexpected consequences as she strives for vengeance.

Cast

Production
The idea for Cherry Bomb began in late 2008 as a collaboration between writer Garrett Hargrove and director Kyle Day. Intended for independent production, the film underwent an extensive pre-production stage which involved many changes involving cast, crew, and union status, which subsequently caused several delays.

Principal photography began on March 2, 2010, and wrapped March 28, 2010. The majority of the film was shot on the Canon 7D, with additional footage shot on the Panasonic HVX200. All locations used were in Austin and surrounding areas.

On April 30, 2010, the first official trailer was released on the Cherry Bomb website via YouTube and garnered overwhelmingly positive responses, largely due to social networking via the Cherry Bomb Facebook page and industry blogs such as Geek Tyrant, Dread Central, and Trailer Addict. Shot in March 2010, the film was premiered at the Portland Underground Film Festival on June 11, 2011.

Awards 
 Portland Underground Film Festival – Official Selection
 Splatterfest – Official Selection

References

External links
 
 

2011 action films
2011 independent films
2011 films
American action films
American independent films
2010s English-language films
Films set in 1984
Films set in Texas
Films shot in Austin, Texas
Girls with guns films
American rape and revenge films
Films about striptease
2010s American films